The Adolph Meyer School, at 2013 General Meyer Ave. in New Orleans, Louisiana, was listed on the National Register of Historic Places in 2016.

It is an elementary school in the Algiers, New Orleans neighborhood. Quadrangular in plan, it is a two-story building designed by the Orleans Parish School Board's in-house architect E. A. Christy. It was built in 1917 and expanded in 1924, both to Christy's designs.  An annex was added in the 1930s. The listing includes the school, its annex, and a caretaker's cottage (or custodial cottages), the latter on the southeast corner of the site at 2020 Diana Street. Renamed after Harriet Tubman in the 1990s, it is today one of the three public charter elementary schools operated by Crescent City Schools.

One reason for its significance is its Craftsman style design.  It is one of only two Craftsman style frame schools surviving in New Orleans.

It was named for Adolph Meyer, a Confederate general in the American Civil War who advocated for the construction of the Algiers Naval Station, across the street, and who was a long-time U.S. Congressman.  It was renamed for Harriet Tubman as the  Harriet R. Tubman Elementary School in the 1990s.

Across General Meyer Avenue is the  U.S. Naval Station Algiers Historic District, which was listed on the National Register in 2013.

References

Defunct elementary schools in New Orleans
Public elementary schools in Louisiana
School buildings on the National Register of Historic Places in Louisiana
American Craftsman architecture in Louisiana
School buildings completed in 1917
1917 establishments in Louisiana